Arthur John Melville Scott (24 May 1878 – 8 September 1957) was an Australian rules footballer who played for the St Kilda Football Club in the Victorian Football League (VFL).

References

External links 

1878 births
1957 deaths
Australian rules footballers from Victoria (Australia)
St Kilda Football Club players
Brighton Football Club players
People educated at Haileybury (Melbourne)